John Smolenski (born May 11, 1973) is an American historian, known for his anthropological approach to colonial American history. His first book, Friends and Strangers: The Making of a Creole Culture in Colonial Pennsylvania, looks at Pennsylvania's turbulent early history as an example of the creolization process through which American colonists changed Old World cultural habits into New World cultural identities. This book represents one of the first attempts to use the creolization paradigm to analyze the development of the Anglo-American colonies. His published essays similarly draw upon concepts like performance theory (see performance studies) and speech act theory popularized in the social sciences and cultural studies.

Smolenski is currently an associate professor of history at the University of California, Davis.

Works include

Friends and Strangers: The Making of a Creole Culture in Colonial Pennsylvania. Philadelphia: University of Pennsylvania Press, 2010.
New World Orders: Violence, Sanction, and Authority in the Colonial Americas. Philadelphia: University of Pennsylvania Press, 2005. Penn Press
From Men of Property to Just Men: Deference, Masculinity, and the Evolution of Political Discourse in Early America /Early American Studies/ 3(2005):253-285.
Hearing Voices: Microhistory, Dialogicality and the Recovery of Popular Culture on an Eighteenth-Century Virginia Plantation, /Slavery & Abolition/ 24 (2003): 1–23.

External links
UC Davis History Department Page

References

21st-century American historians
21st-century American male writers
1973 births
Living people
Historians of the Thirteen Colonies
American male non-fiction writers